Christopher Charles Ingvaldson (born November 1, 1969) is a Canadian teacher and former international field hockey player. He was the head of the Social Studies department at St. George's School (Vancouver) until he was fired June 4, 2010 after being arrested and charged with four counts relating to the possession and distribution of child pornography. On March 28, 2012 he pled guilty to two of the four counts.

Early life
He is a graduate of St. George's School and the University of British Columbia. He was active as a field hockey player from the age of 14; at 17 he joined the  British Columbia provincial team, later playing for the Canadian team until 1994, when an injury precluded that.

Teaching 
Ingvaldson spent 8 years teaching at West Point Grey Academy - a Vancouver independent school - where he became the head of the Social Studies department in his last few years there. Near the end of the 2005-2006 school year, Chris Ingvaldson announced that he was leaving West Point Grey Academy. September 2006 marked the beginning of his teaching career at St. George's School, where he was the head of the Social Studies department until 2010.  Justin Trudeau taught French at West Point Grey Academy from 1999-2001, during Ingvaldson's tenure there. Trudeau had been Ingvaldson's roommate in the school's Douglas Lodge during their time as colleagues.

Arrest and guilty plea 
On June 4, 2010, St. George's School issued a statement announcing Ingvaldon's dismissal. His dismissal, pending further investigation, was an immediate response to his being placed under arrest and charged with four counts relating to the possession and distribution of child pornography. He entered pleas in B.C. Provincial Court in Vancouver to accessing child pornography and possession of child porn on March 28, 2012. Ingvaldson was also initially charged with two counts of importing or distributing child pornography. At the time he was charged, Royal Canadian Mounted Police stated that 11 members of the ring in three countries, Canada, Australia and the United Kingdom - had been arrested.

References

External links 
 

1969 births
Living people
Sportspeople from British Columbia
Canadian male field hockey players
People from New Westminster
Ingvaldson, Christopher
St. George's School (Vancouver) alumni
University of British Columbia alumni